Insch is a village in the Garioch, Aberdeenshire, Scotland.

Etymology
The name of the village may have come from the Scottish Gaelic innis, meaning an island, or, as in this context, a piece of terra firma in a marsh. Alternatively, inch or innis can refer to a meadow or low-lying pasture which more closely corresponds with the site of the village. Innis also indicates the presence of water - a river, loch or estuary, perhaps - often seen as Inch in place names, as in Perth's famous North and South Inches on the west bank of the River Tay. Inchnadamph at the eastern end of Loch Assynt and The Inch in southern Edinburgh are further examples. Innis can also be translated as haven or sanctuary - an island of safety from enemies or a resting place on the cattle drove.

Transport
The village is served by Insch railway station and has regular bus services to Huntly and Inverurie with connections to Aberdeen and Inverness.

Facilities
There is a small selection of general and specialist shops, and a post office. There is also a leisure centre with a variety of activities next to which there is an 18-hole golf course.  There is also a (greens) bowling club attached to the local library. Houseware shop Stephens DIY, Zero Waste Shopping and refillery with coffee shop Butterfly Effect are on Commerce Street.

There are Church of Scotland and Scottish Episcopal churches.

There are two hotels: The Commercial Hotel, towards the centre of the village, and Station Hotel, next to train station. Houses offer bed and breakfast facilities in response to demand from migrant workers.

There is also a health centre, part-time fire station, library, bowling and a community centre.

A number of small play-parks are scattered around the village, along with a larger play park and football pitch beside the leisure centre.

The village has a regular bus and train service, located on the main Aberdeen to Inverness train line.

Education
Within the village there is a nursery and a Insch Primary School. For secondary education, the pupils usually attend The Gordon Schools in Huntly or sometimes Inverurie Academy in Inverurie.

Insch Golf Club
The game of golf in Insch was first recorded before World War I, with the course being laid around Dunnideer Hill. It was then moved to its present location around 1923 where it existed until 1940, when the ground was seconded by the War Department for use as a grenade range.
Golf was absent in Insch until a committee was formed in 1977 to provide the village with such a facility. A nine-hole course was built by voluntary labour along Valentine Burn and was reopened for play in 1982. The club expanded further in 1987, when a clubhouse facility – complete with changing rooms, office, bar, café and dance floor – was provided from the remnants of temporary accommodation for a local school.
The course was extended by the addition of 12 new holes on the slopes of Dunnideer.

Famous residents
The surgeon/adventurer Robert Daun FRSE (1785-1871) was born and raised here.

Demographics
86% were born in Scotland, 10% in England and 4% elsewhere.

References

External links
 Insch community website 
 Loch Insch Fishery
 Insch Primary School

Villages in Aberdeenshire